Charles Felix may refer to:
 Charles Felix of Sardinia (1765–1831), Duke of Savoy
Charles Reis Felix (1923–2017), Portuguese-American writer
Charles Félix Jean-Baptiste Camerata-Passionei di Mazzoleni (1826–1853), nephew of Napoleon
Charles Warren Adams (1833–1903), pioneer writer of detective novels
Charles Felix Smith (1786–1858), lieutenant-general, colonel commandant of the Royal Engineers